I Will Walk Like a Crazy Horse (French: J'irai comme un cheval fou, also known as I Will Go Like a Wild Horse) is a 1973 French surreal drama film directed by Fernando Arrabal. The movie first released on November 22, 1973 in France and stars George Shannon as an epileptic boy who, falsely suspected of murdering his mother, flees to the desert where he meets a hermit and brings him back to the city where the hermit becomes a circus performer.

Since its release the movie has been shown at some film festivals such as the 2013 Psych Out film festival in Newcastle upon Tyne.

Plot

After the death of his mother (Emmanuelle Riva), the epileptic Aden Rey (George Shannon) flees to the desert in order to avoid any police questioning, as they believe that he was responsible for his mother's death. It is in there that Aden meets the savage yet noble Marvel (Hachemi Marzouk). While the two men bond over their travels, Aden tries to convince Marvel that civilization is much more desirable than the wilderness, although Marvel appears to disagree. During all of this the police continue their relentless pursuit of Aden.

Cast
Emmanuelle Riva as La mère (Madame Rey)
George Shannon as Aden Rey
Hachemi Marzouk as Marvel
Marco Perrin as Oscar Tabak
François Chatelet as Le prédicateur
Marie-France as Bijou-Love (as Marie-France Garcia)
Gerard Borlant as Le concierge
Jean Chalon as Le maître d'hôtel
Raoul Curet as Commissaire Falcon
Luc Guérin as Aden enfant
Antoine Marin as Le boucher
Pedro Meca as Le 1er mangeur
Gilles Meyer as Cascadeur
 as Dell
Camilo Otero as Le 2ème mangeur

Reception

DVD Talk gave a mixed review, saying that the movie would appeal most to fans of surrealist cinema and that "Some of its graphic nature may have dulled over time, some not, and it is a bit heavy-handed, but it still holds up as an interesting work for those open to the distinctive surrealist storytelling style."

References

External links

1973 films
1973 drama films
1973 LGBT-related films
Films directed by Fernando Arrabal
Films shot in Tunisia
French avant-garde and experimental films
French drama films
1970s French-language films
French independent films
Transgender-related films
1970s French films